The 2022 BBL Playoffs was the concluding postseason of the 2021–22 Basketball Bundesliga season. The playoffs started on 6 May and ended on 19 June 2022.

Playoff qualifying

Bracket
All three rounds of the playoffs were played in a best-of-five format, with the higher seeded team playing the first, third and fifth game at home.

Quarterfinals
The quarterfinals were played in a best of five format from 13 to 20 May 2022.

Alba Berlin vs Brose Bamberg

Telekom Baskets Bonn vs Hamburg Towers

Bayern Munich vs Niners Chemnitz

Riesen Ludwigsburg vs ratiopharm Ulm

Semifinals
The semifinals will be played in a best of five format between 27 May and 8 June 2022.

Alba Berlin vs Riesen Ludwigsburg

Telekom Baskets Bonn vs Bayern Munich

Finals
The final was played in a best of five format between 10 and 19 June 2022.

Notes

References

External links
Official website 

BBL Playoffs
Germany